Orlando Madrigal (13 March 1921 – 25 June 1991) was a Costa Rican judoka. He competed in the men's middleweight event at the 1964 Summer Olympics.

References

1921 births
1991 deaths
Costa Rican male judoka
Olympic judoka of Costa Rica
Judoka at the 1964 Summer Olympics
Sportspeople from San José, Costa Rica